N16 or N-16 may refer to:

Roads
 N16 road (Belgium), a National Road in Belgium
 Route nationale 16, in France
 N16 road (Ireland)
 Nebraska Highway 16, in the United States

Vehicles 
 , a German submarine surrendered to the Royal Navy after the Second World War
 , a submarine of the Royal Navy
 Nieuport 16, a French First World War fighter aircraft
 Nissan Almera (N16), a Japanese automobile sold in Europe
 Nissan Bluebird Sylphy (N16), a Japanese automobile sold in Asia

Other uses
 N16 (Long Island bus)
 BMW N16, an automobile engine
 Centre Airpark, an airport in Centre Hall, Pennsylvania, United States
 London Buses route N16
 Nagahoribashi Station, of the Osaka Metro
 Nitrogen-16, am isotope of nitrogen
 N16, a postcode district in the N postcode area